The United States had recently entered World War I, and the soccer world felt the effects as increasing numbers of players joined the armed forces to wage battle in Europe. Soccer was not as hard-hit as some other sports, but all leagues felt the impact; in fact the Čechie team of Chicago lost every member of its roster to enlistment. The United States Soccer Football Association issued a call to its member associations for teams to resist the temptation to strengthen their teams at the expense of others — when wealthy, but decimated teams eye the poorer but complete teams, their wallets and checkbooks should remain pocketed in the name of fair play. A welcome consequence of the war situation was a willingness of the USFA's own warring factions to end their dispute and work together in relative harmony during those trying times. Many soccer organizations launched fund raising campaigns and benefit matches to raise money to provide support for US soldiers through, among other means, the provision of soccer equipment and gear to enhance their recreational opportunities. One such project was the Soccer Football Chain Letter Fund launched by Thomas Cahill and the USFA.

Other welcome events included record attendance figures in some late-round games of the National Challenge Cup that were well promoted. One of the major topics of discussion was the pros and cons of substitutes. At the time the laws did not specifically allow nor outlaw substitutes per se, but the consensus was that eventually they would become a reality. For the 1917-18 year, the USFA reported receipts of $6,318.64 and disbursements of $3,034.39, giving the USFA a net worth of $2,784.25 in cash and one $500.00 Liberty Bond.

Bracket 
Home teams listed on top of bracket

(*) replay after tied match

Final

First game

Replay

See also
1918 American Cup

References

External links
 National Challenge Trophy
 Bethlehem Steel Soccer Club, 1917-1918 (Archived 2009-10-20)
 HickokSports.com
 National Challenge Cup - Google News Archive
 United States Soccer Football Association
 Britanica Online Encyclopedia
 US Soccer History Page2

U.S. Open Cup
Nat